The Sanremo Music Festival, officially the Italian Song Festival, is the most popular Italian song contest and awards ceremony, held annually in the city of Sanremo, Liguria. It is the longest-running annual TV music competition in the world on a national level (making it one of the world's longest-running television programmes) and it is also the basis and inspiration for the annual Eurovision Song Contest.

The first edition of the Sanremo Music Festival, held between 29 and 31 January 1951, was broadcast by RAI's radio station Rete Rossa, and its only three participants were Nilla Pizzi, Achille Togliani, and Duo Fasano. Starting from 1955, all editions of the festival have been broadcast live by the Italian TV station Rai 1.

From 1951 to 1976, the festival took place in the Sanremo Casino, but starting from 1977, all the following editions were held in the Teatro Ariston, except in 1990, which was held at the Nuovo Mercato dei Fiori.

The songs selected in the competition are in Italian (or in an Italian dialect), and the three most voted songs are awarded. Other special awards are also given, including the Critics' Award, created ad hoc by the press in 1982 to reward the quality of Mia Martini's song, and named after the singer in 1996, after her death.

The Sanremo Music Festival has often been used as a method for choosing the Italian entry for the Eurovision Song Contest. It has launched the careers of some of Italy's most successful musical acts, including Gigliola Cinquetti,
Laura Pausini, Eros Ramazzotti, Andrea Bocelli, Giorgia, Il Volo, and Måneskin.

Between 1953 and 1971 (except in 1956), in 1990, and 1991, each song was sung twice by two different artists, each one using an individual orchestral arrangement, to illustrate the meaning of the festival as a composers' competition, not a singers' competition. During this era of the festival, it was custom that one version of the song was performed by a native Italian artist while the other version was performed by an international guest artist. This became a way for many international artists to debut their songs on the Italian market, including Louis Armstrong, Ray Charles, Stevie Wonder, Cher, Gloria Gaynor, Dionne Warwick, Jose Feliciano, Roberto Carlos, Paul Anka, Miriam Makeba, Bonnie Tyler, Shirley Bassey, Mungo Jerry, Kiss, Laura Branigan, and many others.

History

Origin and development

In the aftermath of World War II, one of the proposals to revitalize the economy and the reputation of Sanremo was to create an annual music festival to be held in the city.

In 1948 and 1949, the first two editions of the Italian Song Festival were held in Viareggio, from an idea developed in 1947 by Aldo Valleroni. The competition was discontinued in 1950 due to financial problems, but it became the basis for the future Sanremo Music Festival.

During the summer of 1950, the administrator of the Sanremo Casino, Piero Bussetti, and the conductor of the RAI orchestra, Giulio Razzi, rediscussed the idea, deciding to launch a competition among previously unreleased songs. Officially titled  (literally "Festival of the Italian song"), the first edition of the show was held at the Sanremo Casino on 29, 30, and 31 January 1951. The final round of the competition was broadcast by Rete Rossa, the second most important RAI radio station.
Twenty songs took part in the competition, performed by three artists only–Nilla Pizzi, Duo Fasano, and Achille Togliani.

Starting from the third edition of the festival, held in 1953, each song was performed by two different artists with different orchestras and arrangements. Two years later, in 1955, the festival made its first appearance on television, since part of the final night was also broadcast by RAI's channel Programma Nazionale. The last night of the show was also broadcast in Belgium, France, Germany, the Netherlands, and Switzerland.

In 1964, Gianni Ravera, who organized the 14th Sanremo Music Festival, slightly changed the rules of the contest, requiring each song to be performed once by an Italian artist and once by an international singer, who was allowed to perform the song in any language. The same rule was applied in the following year's contest. Between 1967 and 1971, entries were not forced to be interpreted by foreign artists, but double performances were kept. Starting from 1972, each entry was sung by one artist only.

The competing artists were split for the first time into "Big artists" and "Young artists" during the Sanremo Music Festival 1974. The competition had one winner only, but the entries in the "Young artists" category had to go through an elimination round, while "Big artists" were directly admitted to the final round.

In 1977, the Sanremo Casino, which hosted all the previous editions of the contest, was closed for renovations, therefore the show moved to the Teatro Ariston. The theater later became the usual location for the annual contest, hosting it every year except in 1990, when the show was held at the Nuovo Mercato dei Fiori, also known as Palafiori.

In 1980, pre-recorded backing tracks replaced the orchestra, while playback performances were allowed in 1983 during the final round. In 1984 and 1985, all the artists were forced to perform in playback, while live performances with the orchestra were reintroduced in 1990.
During the same years, several other changes were introduced in the contest. In 1982, accredited music journalists decided to create an award to recognise the best song competing in the festival. Starting from 1983, the prize was officially awarded during the event. The critics' prize was later named after Mia Martini, who was the first artist receiving it in 1982 for her entry "E non finisce mica il cielo".

Moreover, starting from 1984, the separation between newcomers and established artists was marked, introducing two different competitions with separate winners. 
In 1989, a third category, the Upcoming Artists Section, was introduced, but it was removed the following year.
Only in 1998 were the top three artists in the newcomer section allowed to compete in the main competition. This led to the victory of the debuting Annalisa Minetti, which generated some controversy and led to the reintroduction of completely separate competitions starting from 1999.

The distinction among different categories was abolished again in 2004. The following year, the contest included five different categories—Newcomers, Men, Women, Groups, and Classics. The winner of each category competed for the final victory of the contest. The category Classic was abolished in 2006, while starting from 2007, the festival came back to the rules used in the 1990s, with two completely separate competitions for established artists and newcomers.

In 2009, a new competition, held entirely online, was introduced by the artistic director of the 59th edition of the contest, Paolo Bonolis. Titled Sanremofestival.59, the contest was not held in the following years.

Winners

Big Artists section

1950s

1960s

1970s

1980s

1990s

2000s

2010s

2020s

Newcomers section

1980s

1990s

2000s

2010s

2020s

Other sections

"Mia Martini" Critics Award
The "Mia Martini" Critics Award, originally named the Critics Award of the Italian Song Festival and, more informally, simply the Critics Award, is a recognition given to the best song, selected by music experts (journalists and music critics) at the Sanremo Music Festival. The prize was created in 1982 specifically to award Mia Martini's interpretation of her song "E non finisce mica il cielo".

Since 1996, the award has been named after Mia Martini, following her sudden death. A petition was launched by the founder of Mia Martini's official club, Chez Mimi, alongside Alba Calia and Dori Ghezzi and supported by numerous Italian artists, including Mina, Luciano Pavarotti, Fabrizio De André, Lucio Dalla, and Franco Battiato. Pippo Baudo, then-artistic director of the Sanremo Festival and the Critics Award jury, decided to name the prize after the Calabrian artist, specifically because she was the artist who, until then, had won the award the most frequently (three times), as well as having been its first winner.

Big Artists section and Newcomers section

Notable foreign duet singers

Notable guest artists of that time were, among others:

 1964: Peggy March, team partner of Claudio Villa with "Passo su passo", semi-finals only.
 1965: Connie Francis, team partner of Gigliola Cinquetti with "Ho bisogno di vederti".
 1965: Petula Clark, team partner of Betty Curtis with "Invece no".
 1965: Dusty Springfield, team partner of Gianni Mascolo with "Di fronte all'amore", semi-finals only.
 1965: Audrey Arno, team partner of Remo Germani with "Prima o poi".
 1966: Gene Pitney, team partner of Caterina Caselli with "Nessuno mi può giudicare".
 1966: Pat Boone, team partner of Peppino Gagliardi with "Se tu non fossi qui".
 1967: Cher and Sonny Bono, team partner of Caterina Caselli with "Il cammino di ogni speranza".
 1967: Cher, team partner of Nico Fidenco with "Ma piano (per non svegliarmi)"
 1967: Dalida, team partner of Luigi Tenco with "Ciao, amore ciao", semi-finals only.
 1968: Roberto Carlos, team partner of Sergio Endrigo with "Canzone per te" (winner).
 1968: Bobbie Gentry, team partner of Al Bano with "La siepe".
 1968: Dionne Warwick, team partner of Tony del Monaco with "La voce del silenzio".
 1968: Louis Armstrong, team partner of Lara Saint Paul with "Mi va di cantare".
 1968: Wilson Pickett, team partner of Fausto Leali with "Deborah".
 1969: Mary Hopkin, team partner of Sergio Endrigo with "Lontano dagli occhi" (second place).
 1969: Stevie Wonder, team partner of Gabriella Ferri with "Se tu ragazzo mio", semi-finals only.
 1971: José Feliciano, team partner of Ricchi e Poveri with "Che sarà" (second place).
 1990: Dee Dee Bridgewater, team partner of Pooh with "Uomini soli" (winner).
 1990: Ray Charles, team partner of Toto Cutugno with "Gli amori" (second place).
 1990: Miriam Makeba, team partner of Caterina Caselli with "Bisognerebbe non pensare che a te".
 1991: Grace Jones, team partner of Renato Zero with "Spalle al muro".
 1991: Laura Branigan, team partner of Fiordaliso with "Il mare più grande che c'è (I love you man)".
 1991: Ofra Haza, team partner of Raf with "Oggi un Dio non ho".
 1991: Gloria Gaynor, team partner of Gianni Bella with "La fila degli oleandri".
 1991: Bonnie Tyler, team partner of Amedeo Minghi with "Nené".

International successes

Various songs presented during the Sanremo Music Festival over the years have become international hits, including "Nel blu, dipinto di blu" and "Piove (Ciao, ciao bambina)" by Domenico Modugno. "Nel blu, dipinto di blu" spent five non-consecutive weeks atop the US Billboard Hot 100 in August and September 1958 and subsequently became Billboard's number-one single for the year. In 1959, at the inaugural Grammy Awards, "Nel blu, dipinto di blu" became the first-ever Grammy winner for both Record of the Year and Song of the Year. The song "Io che non vivo (senza te)", sung at the fifteenth edition of the Sanremo Festival by Pino Donaggio, was recorded in English by Dusty Springfield under the title "You Don't Have to Say You Love Me". It became  Springfield's most successful single, reaching number one on the UK Singles Chart and number four on the Billboard Hot 100. Elvis Presley recorded a cover version in 1970, which was a hit in both the US and the UK. Other covers have charted in the UK, Ireland, Italy, and Finland.
The song "Non amarmi" by Aleandro Baldi and Francesca Alotta won the Newcomers section at the Sanremo Festival in 1992. It became an international hit, being covered as "No Me Ames" by American singers Jennifer Lopez and Marc Anthony. The song peaked at number one in the Billboard Hot Latin Songs chart. It received a Latin Grammy nomination for Best Pop Performance by a Duo/Group with Vocals. At the Billboard Latin Music Awards of 2000, the song received an award for Hot Latin Track of the Year by a Vocal Duo and two nominations for Tropical/Salsa Track of the Year and Hot Latin Track of the Year.
The song "Che sarà" was sung by Ricchi e Poveri and José Feliciano at the Sanremo Festival in 1971. Feliciano's recorded version was successful in Europe, the Middle East, Japan, and Latin America. The Spanish version of "Che sarà" peaked at number one in Spain and Latin America. The winning song of the 1982 Sanremo Festival, "Storie di tutti i giorni" by Riccardo Fogli, was sung by Dutch singer Marco Borsato, with the title "Dromen zijn deception"; his version became one of the most successful Dutch-language singles of all time. It remained at number one in the Dutch Top 40 for twelve weeks. The song "Quando quando quando" by Tony Renis competed in the Sanremo Festival in 1962 and was covered by many international artists, becoming a best-selling single: Bobby Curtola's version charted at number ten in Canada, Engelbert Humperdinck's reached number forty in the UK, and Pat Boone's version achieved number 95 on the Billboard Hot 100.

The song "Con te partirò" was first performed by Andrea Bocelli at the 1995 Sanremo Festival, topping the charts in several European countries. A partial English version, released in 1996 as "Time to Say Goodbye", achieved greater success, selling more than twelve million copies worldwide and making it one of the best-selling singles of all time. "Non ho l'età" by Gigliola Cinquetti (1964), "Sarà perché ti amo" by Ricchi e Poveri (1981), "Maledetta Primavera" by Loretta Goggi (1981), "Felicità" by Al Bano and Romina Power (1982), "L'Italiano" by Toto Cutugno (1983), "Adesso tu" by Eros Ramazzotti (1986), "La solitudine" by Laura Pausini (1993), and "Il Mare Calmo della Sera" by Andrea Bocelli (1994) also became international hits. In 1994, the song "La mia storia tra le dita", which Gianluca Grignani sang at Sanremo, became a hit in South America, selling two million copies. Nek sang "Laura non c'è" at the Sanremo Festival in 1997, with the song becoming a hit in Europe and Latin America; the Spanish version charted in the US and peaked at number 21 in the Billboard Hot Latin Songs Chart. "Soldi" by Mahmood won the 69th Sanremo Festival and placed second in the Eurovision Song Contest 2019, topping the charts in Greece, Israel, and Lithuania, and reaching the top ten in five more countries. "Zitti e buoni" by Måneskin won both the Sanremo Festival and the Eurovision Song Contest in 2021, topping the charts in several European countries. It peaked at number seventeen on the UK Singles Chart and reached top ten on the Billboard Global Excl. U.S. chart.

In 1966, Adriano Celentano sang "Il ragazzo della via Gluck" at the Sanremo Festival. American singer Verdelle Smith sang an English version of the song, titled "Tar and Cement", which made it to number one in Australia and became one of the year's biggest sellers. The song also reached number 32 in Canada. In the US, it peaked at number 38. In Sweden, Anna-Lena Löfgren sang it with Swedish lyrics as "Lyckliga gatan", making the biggest hit of her career. The song was on the Svensktoppen weekly chart for fourteen weeks and won a Gold record in Sweden; in Norway, the song achieved Diamond and subsequently Platinum status. The song became successful in France when it was covered by Françoise Hardy, under the title "La maison où j'ai grandi".

Hosts

The first edition of the Sanremo Music Festival was hosted by Nunzio Filogamo. He also hosted the next three editions of the musical event. In 2003, Pippo Baudo hosted for the eleventh time, matching the record previously held by Mike Bongiorno. He later overtook this record, hosting the Sanremo Music Festival in 2007 and in 2008. Only seven women have hosted the festival as main presenters. The first women ever to host the event alone were Lilly Lembo and Giuliana Calandra in 1961, followed by Maria Giovanna Elmi in 1978, Loretta Goggi in 1986, Raffaella Carrà in 2001, Simona Ventura in 2004, and Antonella Clerici in 2010.

Full list of festival hosts:

Controversy

In 2009, the song "Luca era gay", written and sung by Povia, was considered by some gay rights organizations as an anti-gay song. The controversy was also based on the name of the song's character: according to Aurelio Mancuso, president of the Arcigay, the name refers to Luca Tolvi, who claimed that Joseph Nicolosi cured his homosexuality. 
Povia denied this thesis and claimed that the song is about a man he met on a train, whose real name is Massimiliano.
The song went on to place second at the Festival.

Trivia

 Whitney Houston, an international guest at the Sanremo Festival 1987, was the only artist to be asked for an encore performance in the history of the contest until then. After singing "All at once", Houston received a standing ovation and the presenter, Pippo Baudo, asked her to perform again.
 Freddie Mercury, an international guest at the 1984 Sanremo Festival, didn't want to perform using playback (a rule at that year's festival), and to protest against this rule, during his performance, Mercury moved the microphone away from his face a few times.
 In The Talented Mr. Ripley by Patricia Highsmith and its film adaptations, Dickie Greenleaf invites Tom Ripley to travel to the Sanremo Music Festival to enjoy some jazz, as a parting gesture before sending Ripley on his way. The ensuing events in Sanremo have major implications for all of the characters.
 In 1960, future Italian pop legend Mina Mazzini made her Sanremo debut. The contest helped launch her career. 
 The song "Perdere l'amore" was proposed in 1987 by Gianni Nazzaro and rejected in the preliminary song screening. A year later, it was proposed by Massimo Ranieri and won the contest.
 In 1990, Patty Pravo turned down the opportunity to participate in the Sanremo Music Festival with "Donna con te", which was sung at the event by Anna Oxa.
 In 2007, the song "Bruci la città" was rejected in the screening, mainly as a decision of that year's artistic director Pippo Baudo, who later explained that the decision was due to the poor quality of the received demo. However, the song was later released by Irene Grandi and became one of her biggest hits.

See also
 List of historic rock festivals
 Sopot International Song Festival
 Italy in the Eurovision Song Contest
 Eurovision Song Contest

References

External links

 
Festivaldisanremo.com – Independent website on Sanremo Music Festival since 1998
 
City of Sanremo

 
Song contests
Music festivals in Italy
Sanremo
Italian music television series
Music of Liguria
Tourist attractions in Liguria
1951 establishments in Italy
Annual events in Italy
Music festivals established in 1951
February events
Winter events in Italy
Eurovision Song Contest selection events